Kamienna Wola may refer to the following places:
Kamienna Wola, Masovian Voivodeship (east-central Poland)
Kamienna Wola, Gmina Gowarczów in Świętokrzyskie Voivodeship (south-central Poland)
Kamienna Wola, Gmina Stąporków in Świętokrzyskie Voivodeship (south-central Poland)